Kenneth Jenkins is the name of

 Kenneth Jenkins (athlete) (born 1913), British sprinter in 1938 European Athletics Championships – Men's 200 metres 
 G. Kenneth Jenkins (1918 – 2005), British numismatist